William Heilman (October 11, 1824 – September 22, 1890) was an American businessman who served two terms as a U.S. Representative from Indiana from 1879 to 1883.

He was the great-grandfather of Charles Marion LaFollette.

Biography 
Born in Albig, Duchy of Hesse-Darmstadt, Germany, Heilman immigrated to the United States in 1843 and settled on a farm in Posey County, Indiana.
After moving to Evansville, Indiana, he worked for a manufacturing company and subsequently became president of a cotton mill.
In 1847, he founded a machine shop for the manufacture of drills.

Political career
He served as member of the city council 1852-1865, as member of the Indiana House of Representatives 1870-1876 and as delegate to the Republican National Convention in 1876.
He served in the Indiana State Senate from 1876 until March 3, 1879.

Congress 
Heilman was elected as a Republican to the Forty-sixth and Forty-seventh Congresses (March 4, 1879 – March 3, 1883).
He was an unsuccessful candidate for reelection in 1882 to the Forty-eighth Congress.

Later career and death 
He resumed his former business activities.

He died in Evansville, Indiana, September 22, 1890.
He was interred in Oak Hill Cemetery.

References

1824 births
1890 deaths
Politicians from Evansville, Indiana
Republican Party Indiana state senators
Republican Party members of the Indiana House of Representatives
Hessian emigrants to the United States
19th-century American politicians
Republican Party members of the United States House of Representatives from Indiana